Division No. 7 is a census division in Alberta, Canada. It is located in the southeast corner of central Alberta and its largest urban community is the Town of Wainwright.

Census subdivisions 
The following census subdivisions (municipalities or municipal equivalents) are located within Alberta's Division No. 7.

Towns
Castor
Coronation
Daysland
Hardisty
Killam
Provost
Sedgewick
Stettler
Wainwright
Villages
Alliance
Amisk
Big Valley
Chauvin
Czar
Donalda
Edgerton
Forestburg
Halkirk
Heisler
Hughenden
Irma
Lougheed
Summer villages
Rochon Sands
White Sands
Municipal districts
Flagstaff County
Paintearth No. 18, County of
Provost No. 52, M.D. of
Stettler No. 6, County of
Wainwright No. 61, M.D. of

Demographics 

See also 
List of census divisions of Alberta
List of communities in Alberta

References 

D07